Aaron Fearne is an Australian basketball coach and former professional player who is an assistant coach for the Charlotte 49ers men's team of Conference USA. He served as the head coach of the Cairns Taipans of the Australian National Basketball League (NBL) from 2009 to 2018.

Playing career
Fearne played college basketball in the United States. He played for Western Wisconsin Technical College during the 1993–94 season and Mid-State Technical College during the 1994–95 season. Fearne played his final two seasons at Mayville State University from 1995 to 1997. He served as a student coach for the team during the 1997–98 season.

Fearne played for the Cairns Marlins from 1998 to 2005. He played for the Cairns Taipans of the NBL as a forward from 1999 to 2001 where he averaged 3.0 points, 1.7 rebounds and 0.6 assists in 38 games.

Coaching career
Fearne served as an assistant coach for the Taipans from 2001 to 2009. He was the head coach of the Marlins of the Queensland Basketball League (QBL) from 2006 to 2009. He led the team to QBL championships in 2007 and 2009. Fearne was named the QBL Coach of the Year in 2006 and 2007.

Fearne was head coach of the Taipans for nine seasons and led the team to three postseason berths. Fearne was named as the NBL Coach of the Year in 2015. On 3 March 2018, the Taipans announced that Fearne would not return as head coach.

On 1 August 2018, Fearne joined the Charlotte 49ers as an assistant coach.

Personal life
Fearne was born in Sydney, New South Wales. He is married and has two children.

References

Year of birth missing (living people)
Living people
Australian expatriate basketball people in the United States
Australian men's basketball coaches
Australian men's basketball players
Basketball players from Sydney
Cairns Taipans coaches
Cairns Taipans players
Charlotte 49ers men's basketball coaches
Forwards (basketball)
Mayville State Comets men's basketball players